North East Gonja District is one of the seven districts in Savannah Region, Ghana. Originally it was formerly part of the then-larger East Gonja District in 1988, until the northern part of the district was split off to create North East Gonja District on 19 February 2019; while the remaining part has been retained as East Gonja Municipal District (which it was elevated to municipal district assembly status on 15 March 2018). The district assembly is located in the eastern part of Savannah Region and has Kpalbe as its capital town.

References

Districts of the Savannah Region (Ghana)